Matthew "Matt" Mann II (1884–1962) was a British-born American college swimming coach and was coach of the men's swim team in the 1952 Summer Olympics that won four gold medals, two silver medals and one bronze medal.

He learnt to swim at eight in his hometown of Leeds, England, at the public bath house. He could afford to swim there once a week, on 'dirty water days', when it only cost a penny. Otherwise, he swam in the outdoor sluiceways that drained from the wool mills. He became England's boy champion at 9 and a senior champion at 14. In his early 20s, he emigrated penniless to North America, with his International Swimming Hall of Fame biography stating: "Matt emigrated steerage to the USA, was stopped at Ellis Island for insufficient funds, shipped to Toronto in a sealed railroad car with $2.00 left in his pocket. Walking down Yonge Street, he found a room for $1.00 a week, then bought a week's meal tickets in a bean wagon for his other dollar. 'I was on top of the world,' said Matt. 'I had no money but my needs were taken care of and I had a whole week to look for a job.'"

He was head coach at the Detroit Athletic Club's swim team and Yale University and Harvard University before going on to coach 13 National Collegiate Athletic Association champion swimming teams at the University of Michigan and the University of Oklahoma. He was head coach of the U.S. Men's Swimming Team at the 1952 Summer Olympics. He was one of the 21 people to be inducted into the International Swimming Hall of Fame when it was formed in 1965; he was one of only two coaches (with Robert Kiphuth) and two Britons (with English Channel swimmer Captain Matthew Webb) to be inducted.

Coach Mann was the founder and owner of the first ever sport-specific summer camp. He purchased land along a lake in Canada and opened a boys swim camp, Camp Chikopi, in 1920. Many coaching peers and friends would attend the summer camp and a number of Olympic athletes (at least 30 by 1965) from many nations trained and developed there. Coach Mann and his wife, Lea (Block) Mann, operated Camp Chikopi until Matt's death in 1962. In 1961, the Michigan Interscholastic Swim Coaches Association (MISCA) honored Matt Mann by creating an award in his honor. The award is presented annually to a swim coach who demonstrates continued leadership, contributions, and service to Michigan High School Swimming.

See also
 List of members of the International Swimming Hall of Fame
 University of Michigan Athletic Hall of Honor

References

External links
International Swimming Hall of Fame Biography
Photo and Bio from University of Michigan Site
Michigan Interscholastic Swim Coaches Association

1884 births
1962 deaths
British emigrants to the United States
English swimming coaches
American swimming coaches
Harvard Crimson swimming coaches
Michigan Wolverines swimming coaches
Oklahoma Sooners swimming coaches
Yale Bulldogs swimming coaches